Katharina Löwel (born 22 January 1982), better known under her stage name Kitty Kat or Kitten Ket, is a German rapper and singer. She became famous as an Aggro Berlin member, where she was signed from 2006 to 2009.

Biography
Katharina Löwel was born in East Berlin. Her parents fled with her and her sister to West Germany, where they continued their life in Augsburg. After finishing secondary school, she started training as a bank clerk in Munich. She returned to Berlin in 2003, where she met Paul NZA, who contacted Aggro Berlin, and in 2006 signed with Aggro Berlin, appearing as a guest artist on several releases. Her physical appearance remained a secret until the release of the sampler Aggro Anti Ansage Nr. 8. Since then, she has performed as a solo artist.

In an interview with the magazine Bravo Hip Hop Special, she announced that she was working on her first solo album Miyo!, which was released in mid-2009, after the lead singles "Bitchfresse (L.M.S)" and "Braves Mädchen" had been released.

In 2021, Löwel collaborated with german-rapper Shirin David for their song Be a Hoe/Break a Hoe. The song peaked at number one on the official german music charts.

Discography

Albums

Singles

Other releases

Awards and nominations

Results

References

External links
Aggro Ansage Nr. 8 track list

German women rappers
German rappers
Living people
1982 births
Musicians from Berlin
People from East Berlin
Participants in the Bundesvision Song Contest
20th-century German women